Lady Mary Shepherd, née Primrose (31 December 1777 – 7 January 1847) was a Scottish philosopher who published two philosophical books, one in 1824 and one in 1827. According to Robert Blakey, in her entry in his History of the Philosophy of the Mind, she exercised considerable influence over the Edinburgh philosophy of her day.

Life
Lady Mary Primrose was the second daughter of Neil Primrose, 3rd Earl of Rosebery. She was born at Barnbougle Castle on the family estate near Dalmeny, Midlothian. Privately educated, she married an English barrister, Henry John Shepherd, in 1808.

Although Shepherd's philosophical books only appeared in the 1820s, a memoir by her daughter indicates that their composition in fact predated her marriage. In the first, an essay on the relation between cause and effect, she criticised the views of David Hume, Thomas Brown and the physiologist William Lawrence. In her second book of essays, on the perception of an external universe, she argued against both the idealism of George Berkeley and Thomas Reid's epistemological reliance on natural instinct.

Shepherd's correspondence shows a continuing interest in philosophical questions. A private philosophical controversy with the amateur philosopher John Fearn over the relation between perception and physical extension was published in Parriana (1828). After learning of its publication, Shepherd wrote in defence of her position in Fraser's.

Charlotte Nooth dedicated her 1816 novel, Eglantine, to Shepherd.

Works
 An Essay upon the Relation of Cause and Effect, controverting the Doctrine of Mr. Hume, concerning the Nature of the Relation; with Observations upon the Opinions of Dr. Brown and Mr. Lawrence, connected with the same subject, 1824
 Essays on the Perception of an External Universe and other Subjects Connected with the Doctrine of Causation, 1827
 'Observations of Lady Mary Shepherd on the "First Lines of the Human Mind"', in Parriana: or Notices of the Rev. Samuel Parr, L.L.
 'Lady Mary Shepherd's Metaphysics', Fraser's Magazine, Vol. 5, No. 30 (July 1832), pp. 697–708.
 (Mistakenly attrib.)Enquiry respecting the Relation of Cause and Effect: in which the Theories of Professors Brown, and Mr. Hume, are Examined; with a Statement of Such Observations as are Calculated to Shew the Inconsistency of these Theories; and from which a New Theory is Deduced, More Consonant to Facts and Experience. Also a New Theory of the Earth, Deduced from Geological Observations (Edinburgh: James Ballantyne, 1819)

References

Further reading
 Atherton, Margaret. "Lady Mary Shepherd's Case against George Berkeley." British Journal for the History of Philosophy 4, no. 2 (September 1996): 347–66.
 Atherton, Margaret. "Reading Lady Mary Shepherd." The Harvard Review of Philosophy 8, no.2 (2005): 73–85.
 Atherton, Margaret. Women Philosophers of the Early Modern Period. Indianapolis: Hackett Publishing, 1994.
 Bolton, Martha Brandt. "Causality and Causal Induction: The Necessitarian Theory of Lady Mary Shepherd." In Causation and Modern Philosophy, ed. Keith Allen and Tom Stoneham, 242–61. New York: Routledge, 2011.
 Boyle, Deborah. "A Mistaken Attribution to Mary Shepherd." Journal of Modern Philosophy 2, no. 1 (2020). DOI: http://doi.org/10.32881/jomp.100
 Boyle, Deborah. “Expanding the Canon of Scottish Philosophy: The Case for Adding Mary Shepherd.” The Journal of Scottish Philosophy 15, no. 3 (2017): 275-93.
 Boyle, Deborah. Mary Shepherd: A Guide. New York: Oxford University Press, 2023.
 Boyle, Deborah. "Mary Shepherd on Mind, Soul, and Self."Journal of the History of Philosophy 58, no. 1 (January 2020): 93–112.
 Boyle, Deborah, ed. Lady Mary Shepherd: Selected Writings (Exeter: Imprint Publishing, 2018).
 Fantl, Jeremy. "Mary Shepherd on Causal Necessity." Metaphysica 17, no. 1 (2016): pp. 87–108.
Fasko, Manuel. "Mary Shepherd's Threefold 'Variety of Intellect' and Its Role in Improving Education." Journal of Scottish Philosophy 19, no. 3 (2021): 185–201.
Folescu, M. "Mary Shepherd on the Role of Proofs in Our Knowledge of First Principles." Noûs (2021) DOI: https://doi.org/10.1111/nous.12365
 Landy, David. "A Defense of Shepherd's Account of Cause and Effect as Synchronous." Journal of Modern Philosophy 2, no. 1 (2020). DOI:  http://doi.org/10.32881/jomp.46
Landy, David. "Shepherd on Hume's Argument for the Possibility of Uncaused Existence." Journal of Modern Philosophy 2, no. 1 (2020) DOI: https://jmphil.org/articles/10.32881/jomp.128/
 LoLordo, Antonia. "Mary Shepherd on Causation, Induction, and Natural Kinds." Philosophers' Imprint 19, no. 52 (2019): 1-14.
 LoLordo, Antonia, ed. Mary Shepherd's Essays on the Perception of an External Universe. New York: Oxford University Press, 2020.
 McRobert, Jennifer. "Introduction", in The Philosophical Works of Lady Mary Shepherd, 2 vols, Bristol: Thoemmes Press, 2000.
 McRobert, Jennifer. "Mary Shepherd and the Causal Relation," 2002; revised 2014, http://philpapers.org/rec/MCRMSA
 Paoletti, Cristina. "Restoring Necessary Connections: Lady Mary Shepherd on Hume and the Early Nineteenth-Century Debate on Causality." In Hume, Nuovi Saggi=Hume, New Essays, 47–59. Padova: Il Poligrafo, 2011.
 Rickless, Sam. "Is Shepherd's Pen Mightier Than Berkeley's Word?" British Journal for the History of Philosophy'' 26, no. 2 (2018): 317–30.

External links
 Entry on Mary Shepherd at The International Association for Scottish Philosophy
 Entry on Mary Shepherd at the Stanford Encyclopedia of Philosophy

1777 births
1847 deaths
19th-century British philosophers
Historians of philosophy
Metaphysicians
Philosophers of mind
Scottish philosophers
Scottish women philosophers